Januszewo  is a village in the administrative district of Gmina Susz, within Iława County, Warmian-Masurian Voivodeship, in northern Poland.

The village has a population of 300.

Notable residents

Elard von Oldenburg-Januschau (1855–1937), politician.

References

Villages in Iława County